Maghar is a town and a nagar panchayat in Sant Kabir Nagar district in the Indian state of Uttar Pradesh.

Kabir, the 15th-century mystic poet,
disappeared and fragrant flowers were found in the place of His body. The flowers were divided between His Hindu and Muslim disciples. The Hindus and the Muslims built two memorials here that are 100 metres apart and kept their share of flowers in them.

Geography
It has an average elevation of 68 metres (223 feet).

Religious significance
This place is connected with Kabir. This is the place where he departed from this mortal world. After his departure, his disciples found fragrant flowers only and made two memorials for Saint Kabir. The memorials are situated here just 100 meters away from each other.

Demographics
At the 2011 India census, Maghar had a population of  19,181.

References

 Cities and towns in Sant Kabir Nagar district